Shabtai (Sabbatai, Sabbathai, Shabbatai, Shabbethai, Shabsai, etc. ) is a Jewish masculine name.

According to Encyclopaedia Biblica, as the name stands, it might mean one born on the Sabbath. Most probably, however, the name is a modification of the ethnic Zephathi, 'Zephathite' (such as Zarephathi and Zarephatite). A Babylonian name Šabbatâ'a has been reported from Nippur by Hilprecht.

Notable people

Shabbethai, Shabbatai
Shabbethai Bass
Shabbethai Donnolo
Shabbatai HaKohen
Shabbethai Horowitz
Shabbethai Panzieri
Shabbethai Premsla
 Second name
Moses Shabbethai Beer
Joseph Shabbethai Farhi

Shabsai
Shabsai Frankel (1909–2000), rabbi, businessman, philanthropist, and publisher of Torah books
Shabsa Mashkautsan (1924–2022), Soviet soldier, Hero of the Soviet Union

Shabtai
Shabbethai, one or more biblical figures
Shabtai Ambron, astronomer
Shabtai Bass (1641–1718), father of Jewish bibliography, and author 
Shabtai Zisl ben Avraham, Hebrew name of Bob Dylan (born 1941), American singer
Shabbethai ben Meïr ha-Kohen (1621–62), the "Shach", a noted talmudist and halakhist
Shabtai Daniel (1909–81), Israeli journalist and politician 
Shabtai Horowitz (c. 1590–1660), rabbi and talmudist
Shabtai Sheftel Horowitz (1565–1619), kabbalistic author
Shabtai Kalmanovich (1947–2009), KGB spy
Shabtai Levy (1876–1956), Israeli mayor of Haifa
Shabtai Rosenne (1917–2010), Israeli professor and diplomat
Shabtai Shavit (born 1941), Israeli Director General of the Mossad 
Shabtai Shikhman (1915–87), Israeli politician 
Shabtai Teveth (born 1925), Israeli journalist and academic
Shabtai Zvi, (1626–76), Sephardic rabbi and kabbalist who claimed to be the Jewish Messiah, gaining many adherents, until his conversion to Islam

See also 

Sabbatius
ben Shabbethai

References 

Hebrew masculine given names